In mathematics, function composition is an operation  that takes two functions  and , and produces a function  such that .

Intuitively, composing functions is a chaining process in which the output of function  feeds the input of function .

As a result, all properties of composition of relations are true of composition of functions, such as the property of associativity.

Composition of functions is different from multiplication of functions (if defined at all), and has some  quite different properties; in particular, composition of functions is not commutative.

Examples

Properties
The composition of functions is always associative—a property inherited from the composition of relations. Since the parentheses do not change the result, they are generally omitted.

Commutativity is a special property, attained only by particular functions, and often in special circumstances. For example,  only when . The picture shows another example.

The composition of one-to-one (injective) functions is always one-to-one. Similarly, the composition of onto (surjective) functions is always onto. It follows that the composition of two bijections is also a bijection. The inverse function of a composition (assumed invertible) has the property that .

Derivatives of compositions involving differentiable functions can be found using the chain rule. Higher derivatives of such functions are given by Faà di Bruno's formula.

Composition monoids

Suppose one has two (or more) functions   having the same domain and codomain; these are often called transformations. Such chains have the algebraic structure of a monoid, called a transformation monoid or (much more seldom) a composition monoid. In general, transformation monoids can have remarkably complicated structure. One particular notable example is the de Rham curve. The set of all functions  is called the full transformation semigroup or symmetric semigroup on . (One can actually define two semigroups depending how one defines the semigroup operation as the left or right composition of functions.)

If the transformations are bijective (and thus invertible), then the set of all  possible combinations of these functions forms a transformation group; and one says that the group is generated by these functions.  A fundamental result in group theory, Cayley's theorem, essentially says that any group is in fact just a subgroup of a permutation group (up to isomorphism).

The set of all bijective functions  (called permutations) forms a group with respect to function composition. This is the symmetric group, also sometimes called the composition group.

In the symmetric semigroup (of all transformations) one also finds a weaker, non-unique notion of inverse (called a pseudoinverse) because the symmetric semigroup is a regular semigroup.

Functional powers

That is:

Repeated composition of such a function with itself is called iterated function.
 By convention,  is defined as the identity map on 's domain, .

Note: If  takes its values in a ring (in particular for real or complex-valued ), there is a risk of confusion, as  could also stand for the -fold product of , e.g. . For trigonometric functions, usually the latter is meant, at least for positive exponents. For example, in trigonometry, this superscript notation represents standard exponentiation when used with trigonometric functions:
.
However, for negative exponents (especially −1), it nevertheless usually refers to the inverse function, e.g., .

Under additional restrictions, this idea can be generalized so that the iteration count  becomes a continuous parameter; in this case, such a system is called a flow, specified through solutions of Schröder's equation. Iterated functions and flows occur naturally in the study of fractals and dynamical systems.

To avoid ambiguity, some mathematicians choose to use  to denote the compositional meaning, writing  for the -th iterate of the function , as in, for example,  meaning . For the same purpose,  was used by Benjamin Peirce whereas Alfred Pringsheim and Jules Molk suggested  instead.

Alternative notations

In the mid-20th century, some mathematicians decided that writing "" to mean "first apply , then apply " was too confusing and decided to change notations. They write "" for "" and "" for "". This alternative notation is called postfix notation. The order is important because function composition is not necessarily commutative (e.g. matrix multiplication). Successive transformations applying and composing to the right agrees with the left-to-right reading sequence.

Mathematicians who use postfix notation may write "", meaning first apply  and then apply , in keeping with the order the symbols occur in postfix notation, thus making the notation "" ambiguous. Computer scientists may write "" for this, thereby disambiguating the order of composition. To distinguish the left composition operator from a text semicolon, in the Z notation the ⨾ character is used for left relation composition. Since all functions are  binary relations, it is correct to use the [fat] semicolon for function composition as well (see the article on composition of relations for further details on this notation).

Composition operator

Given a function , the composition operator  is defined as that operator which maps functions to functions as 

Composition operators are studied in the field of operator theory.

In programming languages

Function composition appears in one form or another in numerous programming languages.

Multivariate functions
Partial composition is possible for multivariate functions.

When  is a simple constant , composition degenerates into a (partial) valuation, whose result is also known as restriction or co-factor.

In general, the composition of multivariate functions may involve several other functions as arguments, as in the definition of primitive recursive function.

The partial composition in only one argument mentioned previously can be instantiated from this more general scheme by setting all argument functions except one to be suitably chosen projection functions. Here  can be seen as a single vector/tuple-valued function in this generalized scheme, in which case this is precisely the standard definition of function composition.

A set of finitary operations on some base set X is called a clone if it contains all projections and is closed under generalized composition. Note that a clone generally contains operations of various arities. The notion of commutation also finds an interesting generalization in the multivariate case; a function f of arity n is said to commute with a function g of arity m if f is a homomorphism preserving g, and vice versa i.e.:

A unary operation always commutes with itself, but this is not necessarily the case for a binary (or higher arity) operation. A binary (or higher arity) operation that commutes with itself is called medial or entropic.

Generalizations
Composition can be generalized to arbitrary binary relations.
Considering a function as a special case of a binary relation (namely functional relations), function composition satisfies the definition for relation composition. A small circle  has been used for the infix notation of composition of relations, as well as functions. When used to represent composition of functions   however, the text sequence is reversed to illustrate the different operation sequences accordingly.

The composition is defined in the same way for partial functions and Cayley's theorem has its analogue called the Wagner–Preston theorem.

The category of sets with functions as morphisms is the prototypical category. The axioms of a category are in fact inspired from the properties (and also the definition) of function composition. The structures given by composition are axiomatized and generalized in category theory with the concept of morphism as the category-theoretical replacement of functions. The reversed order of composition in the formula  applies for composition of relations using converse relations, and thus in group theory. These structures form dagger categories.

Typography
In TeX, it is written \circ.

See also
 Cobweb plot – a graphical technique for functional composition
 Combinatory logic
 Composition ring, a formal axiomatization of the composition operation
 Flow (mathematics)
 Function composition (computer science)
 Function of random variable, distribution of a function of a random variable
 Functional decomposition
 Functional square root
 Higher-order function
 Infinite compositions of analytic functions
 Iterated function
 Lambda calculus

Notes

References

External links
 
 "Composition of Functions" by Bruce Atwood, the Wolfram Demonstrations Project, 2007.

Functions and mappings
Basic concepts in set theory
Binary operations